HPHS may refer to:
 Hartford Public High School, in Connecticut, United States
 High Point High School, in Beltsville, Maryland, United States
 High School for Health Professions and Human Services, in New York City
 Highland Park High School (disambiguation)
 Hudson Park High School, in East London, South Africa
 Huntington Park High School, in California, United States